Love at First Stream is a romantic comedy film written by Cathy Garcia-Molina, Kookai Labayen, Ella A. Palileo, Isabella Policarpio and directed by Cathy Garcia-Molina. It stars Daniela Stranner, Kaori Oinuma, Jeremiah Lisbo and Anthony Jennings. The film is about the stories of a streamer, a student, a breadwinner, and a heartthrob as they explore love and friendships online to escape their realities offline. It is an official entry to the 47th Metro Manila Film Festival.

Cast
 Daniela Stranner as Vilma "V" Ramirez
 Kaori Oinuma as Megumi Sakai
 Jeremiah Lisbo as Gino Bautista
 Anthony Jennings as Christopher "Tupe" Rodriguez
 Chico Alicaya as Yuan
 Amanda Zamora as Missy
 Agot Isidro as Rosario Ramirez
 Igi Boy Flores as Gabby Ramirez
 Pinky Amador as Lucy
 RJ Ladesma as Prof. Gomez
 Gail Banawis as Rica
 Quincy Adrienne Villanueva as Issa
 Ashley Polinar as one of the MisYu Top Gifter
 Vien Alen King as Love Guro
 Tonton Gutierrez as Dennis Ramirez
 Hyubs Azarcon as Pip Rodriguez
 Melissa Gibbs as Nora Rodriguez
 Prince Morales as Bobot
 Keagan De Jesus as Doods
 Jessica Dungo as one of the Kumu Streamer
 Liofer Pinatacan as one of the Zoom Classmates

Production
Love at First Stream was produced under the collaboration of Star Cinema and streaming platform Kumu with Cathy Garcia-Molina as its director. The film tackles the theme of the role of social media in establishing and maintaining relationships; both platonic and romantic. Kumu itself is featured in the film. The film stars Daniela Stranner and Anthony Jennings, and Kaori Oinuma and Jeremiah Lisbo who are promoted as belonging to love teams. The pairing of Chico Alicaya and Amanda Zamora are marketed as a "guest love team".

Principal photography for Love at First Stream which began no earlier than July 2021 was hampered by the COVID-19 pandemic. Filming was disrupted due to shifting local government pandemic-related protocols as well as false-positive COVID-19 cases among the production team. In October, rainy weather posed difficulty in capturing day scenes for the film.

Rhys Miguel was originally cast to portray Gino. He was replaced by Lisbo, after Miguel backed out due to personal reasons.

Release
The film was released on December 25, 2021 as an official entry to 47th Metro Manila Film Festival.

References

External links
 

Films set in the Philippines
Star Cinema films
2021 romantic comedy films
Films about social media